Super Mario Bros.: The Lost Levels is a 1986 platform game developed and published by Nintendo as the sequel to Super Mario Bros. (1985). The games are similar in style and gameplay, with players controlling Mario or Luigi to rescue Princess Peach from Bowser. The Lost Levels adds a greater level of difficulty and Luigi controls slightly differently from Mario, with reduced ground friction and increased jump height. The Lost Levels also introduces obstacles such as poison mushroom power-ups, counterproductive level warps, and mid-air wind gusts. The game has 32 levels across eight worlds and 20 bonus levels.

Super Mario Bros.: The Lost Levels was originally released in Japan for the Famicom Disk System as Super Mario Bros.2 on June 3, 1986, following the success of its predecessor. It was developed by Nintendo R&D4the team led by Mario creator Shigeru Miyamotoand designed for players who had mastered the original. Nintendo of America deemed it too difficult for its North American audience and instead chose another game as the region's Super Mario Bros. 2: a retrofitted version of the Japanese Doki Doki Panic. The game was renamed The Lost Levels and first released internationally in the 1993 Super Nintendo Entertainment System compilation Super Mario All-Stars. It was ported to the Game Boy Color, Game Boy Advance, Virtual Console (Wii, Nintendo 3DS, and Wii U), and Nintendo Switch.

Reviewers viewed Super Mario Bros.: The Lost Levels as an extension of the previous game, especially its difficulty progression. Journalists appreciated the game's challenge when spectating speedruns and recognized the game as a precursor to the franchise's Kaizo subculture in which fans create and share ROM hacks featuring nearly impossible levels. This sequel gave Luigi his first character traits and introduced the poison mushroom item, which has since been used throughout the Mario franchise. The Lost Levels was the most popular game on the Disk System, for which it sold about 2.5million copies. It is remembered among the most difficult Nintendo games.

Gameplay

The Lost Levels is a 2D side-scrolling platform game similar in style and gameplay to the original 1985 Super Mario Bros., save for an increase in difficulty. As in the original, Mario (or Luigi) ventures to rescue the Princess from Bowser. The player jumps between platforms, avoids enemies and obstacles, finds secrets (such as warp zones and vertical vines) and collects power-ups such as the mushroom (which makes Mario grow), the Fire Flower (which lets Mario throw fireballs), and the Invincibility Star. Unlike the original, there is no two-player mode, but at the title screen the player chooses between Mario or Luigi. Their abilities are differentiated for the first time: Luigi, designed for skilled players, has less ground friction and higher jump height, while Mario is faster.

The Lost Levels continues the difficulty progression from Super Mario Bros. It introduces obstacles including poison mushrooms, level warps that set the player farther back in the game, and gusts that redirect the player midair. The poison mushroom, in particular, works as an anti-mushroom, shrinking or killing the player character. Some levels require "split-second" precision and others require the player to jump on invisible blocks. There were also some graphical changes, though their soundtracks are identical. After each boss fight, Toad tells Mario that "our princess is in another castle". The main game has 32 levels across eight worlds and five bonus worlds. A hidden World 9 is accessible if the player does not use a warp zone. Bonus worlds A through D are accessible when the player plays through the game eight times, for a total of 52 levels.

Development

The original Super Mario Bros. was released in North America in October 1985. When developing a version of the game for Nintendo's coin-operated arcade machine, the VS. System, the team experimented with new, challenging level designs. They enjoyed these new levels, and thought that Super Mario devotees would too. Shigeru Miyamoto, who created the Mario franchise and directed Super Mario Bros., no longer had time to design games by himself, given his responsibilities leading Nintendo's R&D4 division and their work on The Legend of Zelda. The Super Mario sequel was delegated to its predecessor's assistant director, Takashi Tezuka, as his directorial debut. He worked with Miyamoto and the R&D4 team to develop a sequel based on the same underlying technology, including some levels directly from Vs. Super Mario Bros.

The Lost Levels, originally released in Japan as Super Mario Bros.2 on June 3, 1986, was similar in style to Super Mario Bros. but much more difficult in gameplay"nails-from-diamonds hard", as Jon Irwin described it in his book on the sequels. Tezuka felt that Japanese players had mastered the original game, and so needed a more challenging sequel. Recognizing that the game might be too difficult for newcomers, the team labeled the game's packaging: "For Super Players". They also added a trick to earn infinite lives as preparation for the game's difficulty. Commercials for The Lost Levels in Japan featured players failing at the game and screaming in frustration at their television. After Zelda, The Lost Levels was the second release for the Famicom Disk System, an add-on external disk drive with more spacious and less expensive disks than the Famicom cartridges.

When evaluated for release outside of Japan, Nintendo of America believed The Lost Levels was too difficult and frustrating for the recovering American market and declined its release. Howard Phillips, who evaluated games for Nintendo of America President Minoru Arakawa, felt that the game was unfairly difficult, even beyond the unofficial moniker of "Nintendo Hard" that the company's other games sometimes garnered. His opinion was that The Lost Levels would not sell well in the American market. "Few games were more stymieing", he later recalled of the game. "Not having fun is bad when you're a company selling fun."

Nintendo instead released a retrofitted version of Doki Doki Panic as the region's Super Mario Bros. 2 in October 1988. Doki Doki Panic had originally been developed by Kensuke Tanabe. Tanabe was instructed to use characters from Yūme Kojo ‘87 and it was released in Japan as a standalone game on July 10, 1987. Doki Doki Panics characters and artwork were modified to match Super Mario Bros. before being released in America, and the re-skinned release became known as the "big aberration" in the Super Mario series. The American Super Mario Bros.2 was later released in Japan as Super Mario USA.

Rereleases

Nintendo "cleaned up" parts of the Japanese Super Mario Bros.2 and released it in later Super Mario collections as The Lost Levels. Its North American debut in the 1993 Super Mario All-Stars collection for the Super Nintendo Entertainment System featured updated graphics (including increased visibility for the poison mushroom) and more frequent checkpoints to save player progress. According to All-Stars developers, the compilation was created because Miyamoto felt The Lost Levels had not reached a wide audience and wanted more players to experience it. All-Stars was rereleased as a Limited Edition for the Nintendo Wii console in remembrance of Super Mario Bros. 25th anniversary in 2010. The Lost Levels was edited to fit the handheld Game Boy Color screen as an unlockable bonus in the 1999 Super Mario Bros. Deluxe: the visible screen is cropped and some features are omitted, such as the wind and five bonus worlds. The Lost Levels was rereleased in 2004 for the Game Boy Advance on the third volume of Nintendo's Japan-only Famicom Mini compilation cartridges.

Nintendo's Virtual Console digital platform introduced North America to the unedited 1986 Japanese release. The Lost Levels was released for multiple Nintendo platforms: the Wii's Virtual Console in 2007 (partially in support of Nintendo's Hanabi Festival), the 3DS's in 2012, the Wii U's in 2013, and the Switch's NES catalog in 2019. Nintendo's 2014 classic game compilations NES Remix 2 (WiiU) and Ultimate NES Remix (3DS) included selections from The Lost Levels. For the series' 35th anniversary, in late 2020, Nintendo included The Lost Levels in a limited edition Game & Watch device.

Reception and legacy

At the time of its release, The Lost Levels topped Famicom Tsūshin charts. The game was the most popular game on the Disk System, for which it sold about 2.5million copies. Retrospective critics viewed The Lost Levels as an expansion of the original, akin to extra challenge levels tacked on its end. Despite their similarities, the sequel is distinguished by its notorious difficulty. 1001 Video Games You Must Play Before You Die summarized the game as both "familiar and mysterious" and "simply rather unfair". The Lost Levels replaced the original's accessible level designs with "insanely tough obstacle courses" as if designed to intentionally frustrate and punish players beginning with its first poison mushroom.

Retrospective reviewers recommended the game for those who mastered the original, or those who would appreciate a painful challenge. Casual Mario fans, GameZone wrote, would not find much to enjoy. Nintendo Life reviewer felt that while the original was designed for recklessness, its sequel taught patience, and despite its difficulty, remained both "fiendishly clever" and fun. On the other hand, GamesRadar felt that the game was an unoriginal, boring retread, and apart from its "pointlessly cruel" difficulty, not worthy of the player's time. GamesRadar and IGN agreed with Nintendo of America's choice against releasing the harder game in the 1980s, though Eurogamer thought that The Lost Levels was "technically a much better game" than the Doki Doki Panic-based Super Mario Bros.2 the American market received instead.

The Lost Levels is remembered among the most difficult games by Nintendo and in the video game medium. Three decades after the game's release, Kotaku wrote that the demanding player precision required in The Lost Levels made fast playthroughs (speedruns) "remarkably fun" to spectate. NES Remix 2 (2014), a compilation for the WiiU, similarly segmented The Lost Levels into speedrun challenges, which made the challenging gameplay more palatable. Many years after the release of The Lost Levels, fans of the series would modify Mario games to challenge each other with nearly impossible levels. The challenges of The Lost Levels presaged this Kaizo community, and according to IGN, The Lost Levels shares more in common with this subculture than with the Mario series itself. Indeed, the sequel is remembered as a black sheep in the franchise and a reminder of imbalanced gameplay in Nintendo's history.

Luigi received his first distinctive character traits in The Lost Levels: less ground friction, and the ability to jump farther. IGN considered this change to be the game's most significant, though the controls remained "cramped" and "crippled" with either character. The game's poison mushroom item, with its character-impairing effects, became a staple of the Mario franchise. Some of the Lost Levels appeared in a 1986 promotional release of Super Mario Bros., in which Nintendo modified in-game assets to fit themes from the Japanese radio show All Night Nippon. Journalists have ranked The Lost Levels among the least important in the Mario series and of Nintendo's top games.

Notes

References

External links
 

1986 video games
Famicom Disk System games
Game Boy Advance games
Nintendo Entertainment Analysis and Development games
Nintendo Switch Online games
Side-scrolling platform games
Single-player video games
The Lost Levels
Video games designed by Shigeru Miyamoto
Video games developed in Japan
Video games directed by Shigeru Miyamoto
Video games directed by Takashi Tezuka
Video game sequels
Video games scored by Koji Kondo
Virtual Console games for Nintendo 3DS
Virtual Console games for Wii
Virtual Console games for Wii U
Video games with title protagonists